Catherine Murphy may refer to:

 Catherine Murphy (artist) (born 1946), American realist painter
 Catherine Murphy (politician) (born 1953), Irish independent politician and TD for Kildare North
 Catherine Murphy (counterfeiter) (died 1789), last woman to suffer execution by burning in England
 Catherine Murphy (sprinter) (born 1979), British Olympic athlete
 Catherine Murphy (singer), soprano singer who appeared in the American 1950s Opera Susannah
 Catherine Murphy (filmmaker), American documentarian
 Catherine J. Murphy, American chemist
 Cathy Murphy (born 1967), British actress
 Cathy Murphy (cricketer) (born 1983), Irish cricketer 
 Catherine Murphy (camogie) in All-Ireland Senior Camogie Championship 1992
 Kathryn Murphy, fictional character in The Accused

See also
Kate Murphy, fictional character in Body of Proof
Kathleen Murphy (disambiguation)